Planète Rap is a French radio programme broadcast on Skyrock, hosted by Fred Musa.

Background 
Planète Rap presents Rap and R'n'B artists, with live performances, freestyles, interviews, behind-the-scenes footage, as well as mixes performed and chosen by the guest artists. It is a daily show, broadcast from 8 to 9 pm, Monday to Friday, which devotes an entire week to an artist or a project (compilation releases, events, etc.)

"Planète Rap - La Nocturne" takes place every Friday night from 00:00 to 2:00. The show plays French rap songs and usually invites a guest. There are live freestyles or a feature on the guest and their music.

Audience 
Between 1996 and 2007, Planète Rap was the most popular Rap and R'n'B (radio) programme among the under-25s. As of March 2022, its YouTube channel had 336 thousand subscribers.

Output

Print 
It has also produced a monthly (paper) magazine, Planète Rap Mag, since July 2006. The magazine presents artists, through interviews, photos, posters, lyrics and reviews over about sixty pages.

Television 
At the time it was launched on France 4 in January 2006, it was the "only rap show in French broadcasting". The programme was discontinued on 8 December 2007 on France 4 and broadcast instead on France Ô for a while, before disappearing from the air. On France 4, the programme aired for hour on Saturday evenings at around 7pm. On France Ô, the show was recorded specifically for television and lasted about 30 minutes, including news, freestyles and new tracks.

Trivia 
The rapper Busta Flex was the first guest on Planète Rap in January 1998, beginning a new direction for the show, which previously had no guests.

On the programme "Le QG" presented by Guillaume Pley and Jimmy Labeeu broadcast on YouTube on 8 January 2021, Fred Musa made several revelations about the programme, in particular that he had received threatening letters from extreme right-wing individuals and the presence of underworld figures at Planète Rap 113.

References 

French radio programs
1996 radio programme debuts
French music radio programs